"W. Lee O'Daniel (and the Light Crust Doughboys)" is a song written by James Talley and originally recorded by Johnny Cash for his Jack Clement–produced 1987 album Johnny Cash Is Coming to Town.

Released in late 1987 together with "Letters from Home" as the fourth and last single from the album, the song reached number 72 on U.S. Billboard country chart for the week of December 26.

Content 
The song talks about a band called Light Crust Doughboys.

In the words of C. Eric Banister (Johnny Cash FAQ: All That's Left to Know About the Man in Black), even though it was a good song, it "probably led a lot of listeners wonder, 'Who?'", since the band it was about "hadn't been popular since the mid-1930s."

Track listing

Charts

References

External links 
 "W. Lee O'Daniel (and the Light Crust Dough Boys)" on the Johnny Cash official website

Johnny Cash songs
1987 songs
1987 singles
Songs written by James Talley
Song recordings produced by Jack Clement
Mercury Records singles